James de Peyster Ogden (August 26, 1790 – April 7, 1870) was an American merchant, and businessman.

Early life
Ogden was born in New York City on August 26, 1790, a scion of two well-known New York families.  He was the only child of Dr. Jacob Ogden Jr. (1762–1802) and Mary Reade (née de Peyster) Ogden (1765–1790), who married in 1789.  His mother died a few months after his birth and his father, who was "intimately known and esteemed by the great Washington," had studied medicine alongside Dr. David Hosack when both were students of Dr. Samuel Bard.

His paternal grandparents were Jacob Ogden and Elizabeth (née Bradford) Ogden.  His maternal grandparents were James Abraham de Peyster (a grandson of New York mayor Abraham de Peyster) and Sarah (née Reade) de Peyster (daughter of vestryman and politician Joseph Reade).

Career
Orphaned at age 11, he was adopted by a de Peyster aunt, who died shortly thereafter, and then he went to live with his uncle, Frederick de Peyster.  Ogden then began his business career as a clerk with Van Horne & Clarkson, a mercantile firm in New York City, and then spent several years in Liverpool, England as an agent for LeRoy, Bayard and Company, another mercantile firm.  During the administration of President Andrew Jackson, he held the post of U.S. consul for Liverpool.

Ogden served as the first president of the Atlantic Dock Company, chartered by New York State on May 6, 1840.  The company developed the Brooklyn harbor by erecting a docks, warehouses, and a basin for deep water ships which today is known as Red Hook and South Brooklyn.

In 1845, he began his three year tenure as the first president of Nautilus Insurance Company (today known as New York Life), which had also been chartered in 1840.  The company sold life, fire, and marine insurance, as well as insuring the lives of slaves for their owners (although the company voted to end the sale of insurance policies on slaves in 1848).

Reportedly, he "deeply deplored the Civil War, and his sympathies were very strong with the South; yet he recognized the duty of opposing secession and exerted all his powers against it."

He was a member and president of the Saint Nicholas Society of the City of New York, an organization of men who are descended from early inhabitants of the State of New York, serving from 1850 to 1851, and again from 1856 to 1857.  He was also a founding member of the New York Chamber of Commerce, of which he served as president of from 1842 to 1845.

Personal life
Ogden was married to Lavinia Beckwith. Together, they were the parents of three children, two sons and a daughter, namely Charles Richard Ogden (1840–1882), who married Bessie A. Jerome (d. 1918); James Ogden; and Mary Elizabeth Ogden, who married George Hyatt.

Ogden died on April 7, 1870.  His funeral was held at Trinity Church and he was buried at Green-Wood Cemetery in Brooklyn, New York.

References

External links
 Guide to the Atlantic Dock Company collection 1978.151 at the Brooklyn Historical Society
 Address to the Whigs of the state of New-York on abolition and agitation by James D. P. Ogden, 1850

1790 births
1870 deaths
American people of Dutch descent
De Peyster family
Presidents of the Saint Nicholas Society of the City of New York
Burials at Green-Wood Cemetery